Beyond Flavor is Original Flavor's second and final album was recorded in 1993 and released in early 1994. Its first single, "Can I Get Open," featured Jay-Z (who was unsigned at the time). The group disbanded after this album released, but they did begin work with Roc-A-Fella Records with Jay-Z, Damon Dash and Kareem Burke.

Track listing

References

1993 albums
Albums produced by Ski Beatz
Atlantic Records albums
Original Flavor albums